James Francis Hughes (born 7 May 1965) is a Scottish former footballer who played for Dumbarton, Airdrie, Ayr United and Stranraer.

Following his career in football, Hughes went onto train as a teacher of primary education and is currently the Head Teacher of Stanley Primary School in Ardrossan in North Ayrshire, Scotland.

References

1965 births
Scottish footballers
Dumbarton F.C. players
Airdrieonians F.C. (1878) players
Stranraer F.C. players
Ayr United F.C. players
Scottish Football League players
Living people
Association football midfielders